The Lilieci gas field is a natural gas field located in Hemeiuș, Bacău County. It was discovered in 2009 and developed by and Aurelian Oil & Gas. It began production in 2010 and produces natural gas and condensates. The total proven reserves of the Lilieci gas field are around 147 billion cubic feet (4.2 km³), and production is slated to be around 4.6 million cubic feet/day (0.13×105m³) in 2010.

References

Natural gas fields in Romania